KHBS (channel 40) is a television station in Fort Smith, Arkansas, United States, affiliated with ABC and The CW Plus. It is simulcast full-time over satellite station KHOG-TV (channel 29) in Fayetteville. Owned by Hearst Television and jointly branded as "40/29", the two stations maintain studios on Ajax Avenue in Rogers, with a secondary studio and news bureau on North Albert Pike Avenue/North 42nd Street (south of Kelley Highway) in Fort Smith. KHBS' transmitter is located on Cavanal Hill in northwestern Le Flore County, Oklahoma (northwest of Poteau), while KHOG-TV's transmitter is based near Ed Edwards Road in rural northeastern Washington County, Arkansas, just southeast of the Fayetteville city limits.

KHOG-TV relays KHBS' programming to areas of far northwestern Arkansas and southwestern Missouri that are not covered by the primary station's signal. During the analog era, the Fort Smith–Fayetteville market's size and terrain precluded stations with transmitters closer to Fort Smith from reaching northern portions of the market.

History
Channel 40 began as KFPW-TV on July 28, 1971. It was owned by local businessman Bob Hernreich along with KFPW radio (1230 AM). The station was a primary CBS affiliate with a secondary ABC affiliation. Before channel 40's arrival, all three networks had been shoehorned on primary NBC affiliate KFSA-TV (channel 5, now CBS affiliate KFSM-TV).

KFPW-TV found the going difficult against channel 5 largely because of the difficulties experienced by UHF stations operating in rugged terrain. Most seriously, it was all but unviewable in Fayetteville and the surrounding area—a problem exacerbated by its transmitter being located in Oklahoma. Many viewers in the northern part of the market watched CBS on KTVJ in Joplin, Missouri (now NBC affiliate KSNF).

A solution came in the form of the license for KGTO-TV, which had served Fayetteville as a primary NBC and secondary CBS affiliate on channel 36 from February 8, 1969 to December 23, 1973. Hernreich's father, George, had actually bought KGTO in 1973 with the intent of turning it into a satellite of KFPW-TV, but concerns by the Federal Communications Commission (FCC) about Heinreich's operation of KAIT in Jonesboro delayed final FCC approval for the purchase until 1976. Further delays came when severe damage to KGTO's transmitter, as well as a series of thefts, required building a completely new transmitter. In order to save money and return the station to the air, Hernreich moved the station's license to channel 29. The station finally went on the air on December 8, 1977 as KTVP, a full-time satellite of KFPW-TV.

In 1983, the Hernreich family sold off its radio stations, KFPW and KXXI-FM. The Hernreichs changed channel 40's call letters to KHBS (for Hernreich Broadcasting System) on March 21. Two years later, in 1985, Bob Hernreich bought a stake in Sigma Broadcasting (becoming its chairman and CEO in 1989), merging KHBS and KTVP into Sigma. On September 1, 1987, KTVP became KHOG-TV–a nod to the Arkansas Razorbacks, who are often called "the Hogs." Argyle Television bought the stations in 1996. A year later, Argyle merged with Hearst. In October 2007, KHBS and KHOG-TV moved their operations to new, state of the art studios in Rogers.

Subchannel history

KHBS-DT2/KHOG-DT2
KHBS-DT2/KHOG-DT2 (branded as Arkansas CW) is the CW-affiliated second digital subchannel of KHBS and KHOG, broadcasting in high definition on channel 40.2 in Fort Smith and channel 29.2 in Fayetteville. All programming on KHBS-DT2/KHOG-DT2 is received through The CW's programming feed for smaller media markets, The CW Plus, which provides a set schedule of syndicated programming acquired by The CW during time periods without network programs; however, Hearst Television handles local advertising and promotional services for the subchannel.

KHBS-DT2's history traces back to the September 18, 2006, launch of a cable-only affiliate of The CW—a network created as a joint venture between CBS Corporation and the Warner Bros. Entertainment division of Time Warner, as a de facto consolidation of UPN and The WB that initially featured programs from its two predecessor networks as well as new series specifically produced for The CW.—that was managed, promoted and had its advertising sales handled by local cable provider Cox Communications, alongside the launch of The CW Plus, a national service that was created to provide broad coverage of The CW to smaller areas with a Nielsen Media Research market ranking above #100 and was affiliated via local origination channels managed by cable providers or local television stations and primary or subchannel-only affiliations with broadcast stations. The channel—which was branded on-air as "KCWA" (for "The CW Arkansas"), an unofficial callsign assigned by Cox as it was a cable-exclusive outlet not licensed by the FCC—was one of the few cable-only CW Plus affiliates to have signed on at the network's launch. (The predecessor service operated by The WB, The WB 100+ Station Group, was affiliated with Harrison-licensed KWBM [channel 31, now a Daystar owned-and-operated station], since 2001; in most markets where The CW Plus was initially available via cable, the successor cable-only CW Plus outlet usually was a former affiliate of The WB 100+.)

On April 9, 2008, in a joint announcement by the network and KHBS/KHOG's parent company, Hearst-Argyle Television announced that it would launch a CW-affiliated digital subchannel on the DT2 feeds of KHBS and KHOG to relay the network's programming throughout the Fort Smith–Fayetteville market. Hearst-Argyle assumed promotional and advertising control of "KCWA"—which had its former "CW Arkansas" branding retained in the over-the-air transition—from Cox Communications with the subsequent sign-on of KHBS/KHOG's CW subchannels, and converted the cable-only affiliate into an over-the-air digital feed on KHBS-DT 40.2 and KHOG-DT 29.2 to provide The CW's programming to viewers throughout Northwest Arkansas who do not subscribe to cable television. KHBS-DT2/KHOG-DT2 signed on as an affiliate of The CW (via The CW Plus) on April 28, 2008, assuming "KCWA"s former channel slot on Cox basic cable channel 4 (a high definition feed of the channel was also provided to Cox subscribers on digital channel 2004). On June 15, 2012, KHBS/KHOG upgraded "The Arkansas CW" subchannel to 720p high definition, providing over-the-air access to HD content from The CW in the Fort Smith–Fayetteville market for the first time.

KHBS-DT3/KHOG-DT3
KHBS-DT3/KHOG-DT3 (branded as MeTV Arkansas) is the MeTV-affiliated third digital subchannel of KHBS and KHOG, broadcasting in widescreen standard definition on channel 40.3 in Fort Smith and channel 29.3 in Fayetteville. In addition to carrying MeTV programming, KHBS-DT3/KHOG-DT3 is also designated as an alternate ABC affiliate, and carries network (and occasionally, syndicated) programs that KHBS/KHOG must preempt to carry extended breaking news or severe weather coverage or special event programming on its main channel.

KHBS/KHOG launched a digital subchannel on virtual channels 40.3 and 29.3 on January 2, 2017 to serve as an affiliate of the classic television network MeTV, under an extension of an affiliation agreement between Hearst and MeTV parent Weigel Broadcasting. On August 28, 2017, KHBS-DT3/KHOG-DT3 switched to a 16:9 widescreen standard definition format; prior to the upgrade, ABC and syndicated programs presented in widescreen were transmitted on the subchannel in a horizontally compressed format to fit the subchannel's 4:3 aspect frame.

Programming
KHBS/KHOG currently broadcasts the complete ABC network schedule, although it does not clear the ABC News Brief that airs during ABC Daytime programming in order to run additional local advertising. The station airs the Litton's Weekend Adventure block on a one-hour delay from its "live feed" due to the third hour of its Saturday morning newscast, although midday college football games carried by ABC during the fall may subject Weekend Adventure programs normally aired on Saturdays in the 11:00 a.m. hour to be deferred to Sunday mornings to fulfill educational programming obligations. 

The station may preempt some ABC programs in order to air long-form breaking news or severe weather coverage, or occasional specials produced by KHBS/KHOG's news department. However, Power Rangers, which was part of the now-defunct ABC Kids block until August 28, 2010, was preempted by the station, and most of the other Hearst-owned ABC affiliates of the time, for lacking E/I content. As well, in 2004, KHBS and the other Hearst-owned ABC affiliates ran Far and Away instead of an unedited broadcast of Saving Private Ryan.

ABC shows preempted or otherwise interrupted by such content may either be rebroadcast on tape delay over KHBS/KHOG's main channel in place of regular overnight programs or diverted to its DT3 subchannel in place of MeTV programming. Station personnel also gives viewers who subscribe to AT&T U-verse, DirecTV, Dish Network and other pay television providers within the KHBS/KHOG viewing area that do not carry its DT3 feed the option of watching the affected shows on ABC's desktop and mobile streaming platforms or its cable/satellite video-on-demand service the day after their initial airing.

News operation

, KHBS/KHOG presently broadcasts 31½ hours of locally produced newscasts each week (with five hours each weekday, three hours on Saturdays, and 3½ hours on Sundays). In addition, the station produces 9½ hours of locally produced newscasts each week for its CW-affiliated DT2 subchannel (with 1½ hours on weekdays, and one hour each on Saturdays and Sundays). The station may also simulcast long-form severe weather coverage on KHBS-DT2/KHOG-DT2 in the event that a tornado warning is issued for any county in its viewing area within northwest Arkansas and east-central Oklahoma.

On April 18, 2011, KHBS/KHOG expanded its weekday morning newscast 40/29 News Sunrise, to 2½ hours from 4:30 to 7:00 a.m., becoming one of the smallest stations in terms of market size to extend its morning newscast to a 4:30 a.m. start time. On September 13, 2011, the stations became the first in the Fort Smith–Fayetteville television market to begin broadcasting its newscasts in 16:9 widescreen standard definition. The station is currently broadcast in full 1080i high definition.

On August 20, 2012, KHBS/KHOG debuted a half-hour prime time newscast at 9:00 p.m. for its DT2 subchannel, titled 40/29 News at 9:00 on The Arkansas CW. The nightly program – which airs in place of syndicated programs shown on The CW Plus's national feed during that slot.  

Additional news expansion on "The Arkansas CW" took place on September 6, 2016, when KHBS/KHOG began producing a half-hour 7:00 a.m. extension of its weekday morning show for the subchannel, under the title 40/29 News Sunrise on The Arkansas CW.  The program features the same team that anchors 40/29 News Sunrise. The newscast expanded to a full hour on September 11, 2017. The following year, on September 23, 2017, the station began producing a half-hour Saturday and Sunday edition of its 5:00 p.m. newscast for KHBS-DT2/KHOG-DT2.

Technical information

Subchannels
The stations' digital signals are multiplexed:

Analog-to-digital conversion
Both stations discontinued regular programming on their analog signals, respectively on June 12, 2009, the official date in which full-power television stations in the United States transitioned from analog to digital broadcasts under federal mandate. The station's digital channel allocations post-transition are as follows:
 KHBS discontinued regular programming on its analog signal, over UHF channel 40; the station's digital signal remained on its pre-transition UHF channel 21, using PSIP to display the station's virtual channel as its former UHF analog channel 40.
 KHOG-TV discontinued regular programming on its analog signal, over UHF channel 29; the station's digital signal remained on its pre-transition UHF channel 15, using PSIP to display the station's virtual channel as its former UHF analog channel 29.

References

External links
  - KHBS-KHOG official website
 www.thearkansascwcrew.com - KHBS-DT2/KHOG-DT2 ("The Arkansas CW") official website
 www.metvfortsmith.com - KHBS-DT3/KHOG-DT3 ("MeTV Arkansas") official website

ABC network affiliates
MeTV affiliates
HBS
Television channels and stations established in 1971
1971 establishments in Arkansas
Hearst Television